Ecuador participated at the 2003 Pan American Games, held in Santo Domingo, Dominican Republic, from 1 to 17 August 2003.

Medals

Gold

Men's 105 kg: Boris Burov
Women's 58 kg: María Escobar

Silver

Women's +75 kg: Seledina Nieve

Bronze

Women's Kata: Yessenia Reyes

Women's 57 kg: Elizabeth Franco

Results by event

Athletics

Track

Road

Boxing

Swimming

Men's competitions

Triathlon

See also
Ecuador at the 2004 Summer Olympics

References

 Ecuadorian Olympic Committee

Nations at the 2003 Pan American Games
Pan American Games
2003